Darvish Soltani (also Romanized as Darvīsh Solṭānī) is a village in Golestan Rural District, in the Central District of Sirjan County, Kerman Province, Iran. At the 2006 census, its population was 125, in 30 families.

References 

Populated places in Sirjan County